Thomas or Tom Nash may also refer to:

Thomas Nash (relative of Shakespeare) (c. 1593-1647), a relative of William Shakespeare's.
Thomas Nash (RAF officer) (1891–1918), World War I flying ace
Thomas Nash (Newfoundland) (1730–1810), fisherman and settler in Newfoundland
Tom Nash (American football) (1905–1972), American football player
Tom Nash, professional wrestler and first husband of Luna Vachon
Tom Nash (Home and Away), a character from an Australian soap opera
Thomas Nash, a character from the ABC television show Agents of S.H.I.E.L.D.
Thomas Hawkes Nash III (1945–), American lichenologist

See also
Thomas Nashe (1567–c. 1601), Elizabethan playwright and pamphleteer
Thomas Nast (1840–1902), cartoonist